Città della Pieve is a comune (municipality) in the Province of Perugia in the Italian region Umbria, located in Valdichiana a few kilometres from the border between Umbria and Tuscany, and about  southwest of Perugia and  southeast of Chiusi in Tuscany.

Etruscan tombs have been found in the neighbourhood, but it is not certain that the present town stands on an ancient site. It was the birthplace of the painters Pietro Vannucci (Perugino), possessing several of his works, and Niccolò Circignani.

Città della Pieve borders the following municipalities: Allerona, Castiglione del Lago, Fabro, Monteleone d'Orvieto, Paciano, Piegaro in Umbria, and Cetona, Chiusi and San Casciano dei Bagni in Tuscany.

History 
The origins of Città della Pieve are still unknown today. Before becoming a Christian city it certainly had another name (as Guiducci says in his "Historical briefing of Città della Pieve of 1686): Monte di Apollo, Castelforte di Chiuscio, Salepio or Castrum Salepia. In the second century, religion became stronger and stronger. Christian, a plebe was created from which the name Pieve di San Gervasio (from one of the SS protectors). The name remained so until the whole town was enclosed by solid walls and towers. Documents dating back to immediately after the year 1000 indicate it was named Castrum Plebis S. Gervasi. From the fourteenth to the seventeenth century the name was shortened to Castrum Plebis and in about 1600, Pope Clement VIII elevated it to a city calling it City of Castel della Pieve (in lat. Comunitas Civitatis Castri Plebis) but , this name because it is too long and easily confused with Città di Castello, was almost immediately replaced with the current Città della Pieve.

Notable residents
Notable former and current village inhabitants include:
 Pietro Perugino, an Italian Renaissance painter.
 Diana Bacosi, an Italian shooter.
 Mario Draghi, former President European Central Bank and former Prime Minister of Italy.

References

External links
 www.cittadellapieve.org

Cities and towns in Umbria